Figur 5 is an album by Couch, an instrumental band based in Munich, Germany on the Morr Music label.

Track listing
"Gegen Alles Bereit"
"Zwei Streifen Im Blau"
"Alles Sagt Ja"
"Blinde Zeichen"
"Position: Wieder Eins"
"Große Verzögerung"
"Manchmal Immer Wieder"
"Einhängen und Positiver"
"Läßt Nicht Nach"

2006 albums
Morr Music albums